Martin Wolfram (born 29 January 1992 in Dresden) is a German diver. He represented Germany at the 2012 Summer Olympics. At the time he competed in the Olympics, his height was 5'5" (1m 64 cm) and his weight was 123 lbs (56 kg). Martin injured his arm whilst diving in the 10m platform competition. He finished 4th in the preliminary rounds with 496.80, 5th in the semi-finals with 519.00 and 8th in the finals 506.65. He was flown back to Germany after his injury.

At the 2016 Summer Olympics, he competed in the men's 10 m platform event. He finished in 5th place.

References

External links

1992 births
Living people
Divers from Dresden
German male divers
Olympic divers of Germany
Divers at the 2012 Summer Olympics
Divers at the 2016 Summer Olympics
Divers at the 2020 Summer Olympics
21st-century German people